Leusdon is a parish in the southern part of Dartmoor in the county of Devon, UK. It is near Poundsgate and Ponsworthy.

The village church is St John the Baptist's, Leusdon, built in 1863.

At the church a memorial bench raised over the departed Sarah Catherine Hayter, married Ehler. 1940-1984
 
Nearby is Leusdon Common, a site of special scientific interest, now in the Widecombe in the Moor parish.

References

External links
 St John the Baptist, Leusdon

Dartmoor
Villages in Devon